Chilcoot may refer to:
 Chilcoot, California, an unincorporated community
 Chilkoot River, Alaska
 Chilkoot Pass, in Alaska and British Columbia, Canada
 Chilkoot Lake, Alaska
 Chilkoot Inlet, Alaska

See also
 Chilcoot-Vinton, California, a census-designated place